Károly Németh (born 10 November 1957) is a Hungarian judoka. He competed in the men's half-middleweight event at the 1988 Summer Olympics.

References

External links
 

1957 births
Living people
Hungarian male judoka
Olympic judoka of Hungary
Judoka at the 1988 Summer Olympics
Sportspeople from Pest County